Marius Marcel Constantin (born 25 October 1984) is a Romanian professional footballer who plays as a centre-back for Liga I team FC Argeș Pitești, which he captains.

Club career

Rapid București
Constantin was transferred to Rapid from FC Brașov in 2004.

Vaslui
On 31 August 2011, Constantin started training with Liga I club, SC Vaslui, and on 8 September he signed a three-year contract with the Moldavian team. Three days later, Constantin made his competitive debut for Vaslui, in a 3–1 home win against Dinamo București.

On 13 July 2012, Constantin signed for four years with Rapid.

In July 2014, ASA Târgu Mureș announced they reached an agreement to sign Constantin for a season.

International career
Marius Constantin played four games for Romania, making his international debut on 27 May 2004, when he came as a substitute and replaced Mirel Rădoi in the 82nd minute of a friendly which ended with a 1–0 loss against Ireland. In 2007 he played in a friendly against Germany which ended with a 3–1 loss and in a Euro 2008 qualification match against Albania which ended with a 6–1 victory. Constantin's last appearance for the national team was on 12 August 2009 in a friendly which ended with a 1–0 victory against Hungary.

On 25 March 2008 he was decorated by the president of Romania, Traian Băsescu for the results on Qualifying to EURO 2008 and qualification to UEFA Euro 2008 Group C with Medalia "Meritul Sportiv" — (The Medal "The Sportive Merit") class III.

Controversy
He has been involved in multiple alcohol related incidents including a driving under influence in 2010, and showing up inebriated at practice while playing for Gaz Metan in 2019. This was probably the reason the team let him go. His former coach Marius Sumudica banned him from Rapid in 2011 after a confrontation regarding his extra professional life while also accusing him of showing up drunk at practice.

Career statistics

International

Honours
Rapid București
Cupa României: 2005–06, 2006–07
Supercupa României: 2007

ASA Târgu Mureș
Supercupa României: 2015

Jiangsu Sainty
Chinese FA Cup: 2015

Universitatea Craiova
Cupa României: 2020–21
Supercupa României: 2021

Individual
Liga I Team of the Season: 2019–20

References

External links

1984 births
Living people
Sportspeople from Brașov
Association football central defenders
Romanian footballers
FC Brașov (1936) players
FC Vaslui players
FC Rapid București players
ASA 2013 Târgu Mureș players
Jiangsu F.C. players
FC Viitorul Constanța players
CS Gaz Metan Mediaș players
CS Universitatea Craiova players
FC Argeș Pitești players
Chinese Super League players
Liga I players
Romanian expatriate footballers
Expatriate footballers in China
Romania under-21 international footballers
Romania international footballers